Bintuni (Dutch: Steenkool) is a small town and administrative district (kecamatan) in West Papua, Indonesia and seat of the Teluk Bintuni Regency. It comprises two villages (West Bintuni and East Bintuni) with a combined population of 13,795 at the 2010 Census. The town is located near the southeast coast of the Bird's Head Peninsula on Bintuni Bay. It is served by Steenkool Airport. The district had 24,742 inhabitants in 2018.

Climate
Bintuni has a tropical rainforest climate (Af) with heavy rainfall in all months except July and August.

References

Populated places in West Papua
Regency seats of West Papua (province)